Dynasty (season 2) may refer to:

 Dynasty (1981 TV series, season 2)
 Dynasty (2017 TV series, season 2)